"Roads Ahead" is the first single from Canadian rock band Big Sugar's 2011 album, Revolution Per Minute. The song is Big Sugar's first single since reuniting in 2010 and their first single released since 2003.

Music video
The music video for "Roads Ahead" was filmed in the band's dressing room before a show at a festival
in Lloydminster. The video was directed, edited and produced by Gordie Johnson.

References

2011 singles
Big Sugar songs
2011 songs
Songs written by Gordie Johnson